The Beachy Amish Mennonites, also known as the Beachy Mennonites, are an Anabaptist group of churches in the Conservative Mennonite tradition that have Amish roots. Although they have retained the name "Amish" they are quite different from the Old Order Amish: they do not use horse and buggy for transportation, with a few exceptions they do not speak Pennsylvania Dutch anymore, nor do they have restrictions on technology except for radio and television. In the years 1946 to 1977 a majority of the Beachy Amish incorporated certain elements of revivalist practice, such as the preaching of the New Birth. The traditionalists who wanted to preserve the old Beachy Amish ways then withdrew and formed their own congregations. Today they are known as Midwest Beachy Amish Mennonites or Old Beachy Amish.

They form a loose association of churches without a central governing body; therefore, few common characteristics are shared by all Beachy congregations. Other Beachy congregations have organized into denominations, such as the Ambassadors Amish Mennonite Churches and the Maranatha Amish-Mennonite Churches. Some similarities include adhering to the Dordrecht Confession of Faith and practicing varying degrees of Anabaptist practice, such as nonresistance, separation from the state, and believer's baptism.

History 
The Beachy church arose from a 1927 division in the (Casselman) River Old Order Amish congregation in Somerset County, Pennsylvania. Bishop Moses M. Beachy led the congregation during that time and his name became associated with the faction. The Beachys favored a milder discipline for members whose only offense was transferring membership to other Anabaptist churches, specifically the conservative Amish Mennonite congregation that broke from Moses Beachy's congregation (then not under Beachy's leadership) in 1895.

The Beachy Amish were transformed at mid-20th century into a more evangelical group by both the incorporation of revivalist Amish who had left their original churches and joined the Beachy Amish and by a growing revivalist influence within the Beachys. One especially influential man in Lancaster County was an Amish (and later Beachy Amish) evangelist from Oklahoma, David A. Miller. Through his and other revivalist influences an Amish youth group evolved known as the "Goodies" due to their emphasis on a renewed spiritual life and avoiding the period of rumspringa as experienced in many Amish youth groups. Many of the "Goodies" eventually joined the Beachy Amish community in Lancaster County.

Beliefs and distinctives 

In contrast to the Old Order Amish, the Beachys have meetinghouses, Sunday School, and a Bible School for young adults, and most also support missionary work. Excommunication is used less frequently and accompanying bans are even rarer.

Many Beachy churches identify as being a part of the Conservative Mennonite tradition, though they have retained certain practices and a lifestyle still similar to the Old Order Amish include:
 Women wear head covering
 Married men have beards in most congregations
 Television and radio are forbidden
Practices that distinguish the Beachy church from the Old Order Amish include:
 Filtered Internet is permitted by most congregations
 Men wear ready-made clothing
 Ownership of personal automobiles.
Most do not speak Pennsylvania Dutch.

Beachy Amish Mennonites differ from other Conservative Mennonites in that their congregations usually have more autonomy, as opposed to a stronger centralized governance.

Denominations 
Branches off of the Beachy Amish Mennonite Church include more conservative denominations, such as the Ambassadors Amish Mennonite Churches, the Maranatha Amish-Mennonite Churches, and the Midwest Beachy Amish-Mennonites.

Population and distribution 
In 2006, there were 11,487 Beachy members in 207 churches, with the highest representation in Pennsylvania, Indiana and Ohio. International Beachy churches or mission work can be found in El Salvador, Belize, Nicaragua, Costa Rica, Paraguay, Ireland, Ukraine, Romania, Kenya, Australia, and Canada. Mission work is sponsored by Amish Mennonite Aid (AMA), Mennonite Interests Committee (MIC), or individual churches.

See also
 Weavertown Amish Mennonite Church – Oldest existing Beachy church
 Dunkard Brethren, a conservative Anabaptist group in the Schwarzenau Brethren tradition

Literature 
 Cory Anderson and Jennifer Anderson. The Amish-Mennonites across the Globe. Acorn Publishing, 2019.
Cory Anderson: The Amish-Mennonites of North America: A Portrait of Our People. Ridgeway Publishing, 2012.
Alvin J. Beachy: The Rise and Development of the Beachy Amish Mennonite Churches. Mennonite Quarterly Review, Vol. 29, No. 2, 1955, pages 118–40.
 Aaron Lapp: Weavertown Church History. Sugarcreek: Carlisle Printing 2003.
 J. B. Mast: Facts Concerning the Beachy A. M. Division of 1927. Meyersdale, PA 1950.
 Mennonite Church Information 2007. Harrisonburg: Christian Light Publications 2007.
 Devon Miller: Amish Mennonite Directory. Millersburg, OH 2008. A directory of all US and Canadian Amish Mennonites, including the Beachys.
 Dorthy Schwieder and Elmer Schwieder: The Beachy Amish in Iowa: A Case Study. Mennonite Quarterly Review, Vol. 51, No. 1, 1977 pp. 41–51.
 Elmer S. Yoder: The Beachy Amish Mennonite Fellowship Churches. Hartville, OH 1987.

References

External links 
 A Beachy Amish Mennonite information website
 Pilgrim Ministry: Beachy Amish churches
 Journal of Amish and Plain Anabaptist Studies, Vol. 7, Issue 1: Special issue about the Beachy Amish-Mennonites
 Beachy Amish Mennonite Fellowship in Global Anabaptist Mennonite Encyclopedia online
 Profile of the Beachy Amish Mennonite Churches on the Association of Religion Data Archives website

Conservative Anabaptists
Mennonitism
 Sub
Evangelical denominations in North America
Conservative Mennonites